Anxiety is the second album by American post-grunge music group Smile Empty Soul. The album was scheduled to be released in the fall of 2005 via Lava Records, but after numerous push-backs due to heavy protest from religious groups (mainly in regards to the proposed lead single "Holes") the label scrapped the album and Smile Empty Soul departed.  Smile Empty Soul then decided to make a number of "illegal burned copies" and sell them on their own at shows in order to give fans the album since Lava wasn't releasing it. The band even encouraged fans to go online and illegally download the album if they were not able to make it to a show to buy a copy.

In 2008 the band was able to officially release Anxiety through their own label, MRAfia Records.

On March 9, 2010, Anxiety was re-released under F.O.F Label Group titled "More Anxiety". In addition to Anxiety tracks and the MRAfia Version bonus tracks, it also included a re-designed album cover art, a bonus DVD and "Hidden Track" (This is War [2009 Remix]). There is also another variation of More Anxiety that contained another bonus track "Aneurysm" in addition to the previous More Anxiety released by F.O.F. Label Group. This variant was available for free download for those who donated to Smile Empty Soul Feeds the Hunger sponsored by Groupees.

The song "Don't Need You" peaked at number 37 on the Billboard Mainstream Rock Tracks chart.

Track listing 

"Cody" is actually a phone message from Cody (the singer of Troll Forcefield) that was left on Sean Danielsen's answering machine.

Personnel
 Sean Danielsen – vocals, guitar
 Ryan Martin – bass
 Derek Gledhill- drums
 Jake Kilmer - drums (This is War - 2009 Remix) & Aneurysm

See also
 List of anti-war songs

References

2005 albums
Smile Empty Soul albums
Lava Records albums